Tallard is a commune in France. It may also refer to:

 Suzanne Tallard (born 1943), French politician
 Camille d'Hostun, duc de Tallard, Marshal of France
 Marie Isabelle de Rohan, Duchess of Tallard, French noblewoman
 Canton of Tallard